Chandraditya (IAST: Candrāditya) may refer to:

 Chandraditya (Gupta dynasty) alias Vishnugupta, r. c. mid 6th century CE, a king of northern India
 Chandraditya (Gahadavala dynasty) alias Chandradeva, r. c. 1089–1103 CE, a king of northern India
 Chandraditya (Chalukya dynasty), r. c. 646-649 CE, a king of southern India